This article contains a comprehensive discography of the American rock band TV on the Radio.

Studio albums

Demo albums

EPs

Singles

Other
The Late Great Daniel Johnston: Discovered Covered (cover album) – "Walking the Cow"
Warm & Scratchy (Adult Swim compilation album) – "Me – I" (featuring Derek Thomas Ambrosi)
War Child Presents Heroes (charity covers compilation) – "Heroes" (David Bowie cover)

Remixes
 Bumblebeez 81 "Pony Ride (TV on the Radio Remix)" (2004), 81 Records
 Fischerspooner "Never Win (TV on the Radio Hoof-Hearted Mix)" (2005), FS Studios
 Gang Gang Dance "First Communion (TV on the Radio Remix)" (2009), Sinedín Music

Videography
"Staring at the Sun" (March 2004, directed by Elliot Jokelson)
"Wolf Like Me" (September 2006, directed by Jon Watts)
"Province" (January 2007, directed by Jeff Scheven)
"Me - I" (May 2007, directed by Daniel Garcia & Mixtape Club)
"Golden Age" (September 2008, directed by Petro Papahadjopoulos)
"Dancing Choose" (September 2008, directed by Brad & Brian Palmer)
"Will Do" (March 2011, directed by Dugan O'Neal)
"Nine Types of Light" (April 2011, multiple videos directed by varying directors)
"Second Song" (May 2011, directed by Michael Please)
 "Million Miles" (August 2013, directed by Natalia Leite and Kyp Malone)
 "Mercy" (September 2013, directed by Dawn Garcia)
 "Happy Idiot" (October 2014, directed by Danny Jelinek)
 "Lazerray" (December 2014, directed by Atiba Jefferson)
 "Trouble" (April 2015)

Notes

References

External links

Interscope Records profile

Discographies of American artists
Rock music group discographies